Maria Centracchio (born 28 September 1994) is an Italian judoka, bronze medallist in the Women's 63 kg at the 2020 Summer Olympics in Tokyo and gold medallist of the 2019 Judo Grand Prix Tel Aviv in the 63 kg category.

See also
 Italy at the 2020 Summer Olympics

References

External links
 

1994 births
Living people
Italian female judoka
European Games medalists in judo
European Games bronze medalists for Italy
Judoka at the 2019 European Games
Olympic judoka of Italy
Olympic bronze medalists for Italy
Medalists at the 2020 Summer Olympics
Judoka at the 2020 Summer Olympics
Olympic medalists in judo
Judoka of Fiamme Oro
People from Castel di Sangro
Sportspeople from the Province of L'Aquila
21st-century Italian women